Olav Valen-Sendstad (30 June 1904 – 5 May 1963) was a Norwegian theologian, priest, and philosopher.

Biography 
Valen-Sendstad was born in Notodden, Norway, to agricultural school teacher Aksel Sendstad (1872–1922) and Magnhild Valen, and grew up in Kristiania (today Oslo), where he took his examen artium in 1923 and received his cand. theol. degree from the Free Faculty of Theology in 1928. From 1931 to 1941 he was the vicar of Jelsa, and from 1941 to 1955 resident chaplain of St. Johannes Church in Stavanger. I 1948 he received his doctorate; his thesis was Reality and understanding of reality, and from 1948 to 1949 he substituted for professor Arne Næss in teaching philosophy at the University of Oslo. Valen-Sendstad died in Oslo in 1963.

Theologically, Valen-Sendstad championed Lutheran Orthodoxy, and was opposed to modern Protestant theology and Catholicism. He described himself as a "theological and ecclesiastical enfant terrible". He strongly opposed the repeal of the Jesuit clause and published  ('Open letter to the 1954 Norwegian Parliament: will the parliament give Jesuit fascism its moral endorsement?')

Bibliography

References 

1904 births
1963 deaths
People from Notodden
20th-century Lutheran theologians
Norwegian Lutheran theologians
Norwegian Lutheran clergy
Norwegian philosophers